Saber Souid (born 9 March 1981) is a Tunisian former athlete specialising in the hammer throw. He won multiple medals at the continental level.

His personal best of 72.66 metres (2006) is the current national record.

Competition record

References

1981 births
Living people
Tunisian male hammer throwers
African Games silver medalists for Tunisia
African Games medalists in athletics (track and field)
African Games bronze medalists for Tunisia
Athletes (track and field) at the 2003 All-Africa Games
Athletes (track and field) at the 2007 All-Africa Games
Athletes (track and field) at the 2001 Mediterranean Games
Athletes (track and field) at the 2005 Mediterranean Games
Mediterranean Games competitors for Tunisia
Islamic Solidarity Games competitors for Tunisia
Islamic Solidarity Games medalists in athletics
21st-century Tunisian people
20th-century Tunisian people